Eupithecia krampli is a moth in the family Geometridae. It is found in China (Sichuan, Yunnan), and Myanmar.

References

Moths described in 1979
krampli
Moths of Asia